Trivoli is an unincorporated community in Peoria County, Illinois, United States. Trivoli is located along Illinois Route 116 east of Farmington. Trivoli has a part-time post office with ZIP code 61569. It is the former headquarters for Heritage Bank of Central Illinois prior to its sale to Morton Community Bank in 2016.

Demographics

References

Unincorporated communities in Peoria County, Illinois
Unincorporated communities in Illinois
Peoria metropolitan area, Illinois